The Morgan Casket is a medieval-era casket from Southern Italy. The casket, attributed to the Fatimid Caliphate, is made from carved ivory and is dated to the 11th–12th centuries AD.

Description

The casket is made from carved ivory and bone. Said carvings depict sword-wielding men in turbans along with hunters, beasts, and birds; this style of art has been noted to be similar to carvings on the ceiling of the Cappella Palatina in Palermo. The structure of the casket is itself made up of nine panels, four of which make up the body while five make up the lid.

References

Collection of the Metropolitan Museum of Art
Containers
Ivory works of art